Westby-with-Plumptons is a civil parish in Lancashire, England.  The parish is in Fylde district and contains the hamlets of Great Plumpton, Little Plumpton, Lower Ballam, Higher Ballam, Moss Side, Peel, and Westby.  At the 2011 census, the parish had a population of 1,205. Westby and Plumpton are mentioned in the Domesday Book, as "Westbi" and "Pluntun".

Westby-with-Plumptons is part of the Warton and Westby ward, represented by three councillors on Fylde Borough Council.  On Lancashire County Council it is part of Fylde West ward, which elects one councillor.

The parish is now the home of the steel farm-building construction company J. Wareing & Son (Wrea Green) Ltd. which was for many years based in the neighbouring village of Wrea Green.

Moss Side 
Moss Side (Grid Reference SD379302) is located in the south of the parish in between Wrea Green and Lytham with the B5259 road (Lytham Road) being the main road running through the hamlet.

The railway from Preston to Blackpool South runs through the hamlet with Moss Side railway station being located where the railway crosses Lytham Road at a level crossing. The station first opened in 1846, closed in 1961 and was re-opened in 1983. The station in the past had a stationmaster's house and signal box, both of which have been demolished. It is also close to where the Moss Side rail crash occurred in 1924 which claimed the lives of 14 people.

Moss Side used to have a hospital which opened in 1902 as the Fylde Isolation Hospital (later known as Moss Side Hospital) for people with infectious diseases. The hospital closed in 1988 due to being surplus to requirements as well as changes in medical practice and was demolished to make way for new houses.

There was also a small Wesleyan chapel on Lytham Road during the early 20th Century.

Peel 
Peel is a small settlement on the outskirts of Blackpool, featuring Whitehills Business Park which includes several car dealerships, a B&Q store and a Premier Inn. A business park has increased in size over the years to include a variety of small businesses from lawnmower repairs, a print and design company and BMW servicing to larger concerns such as a renewable energy company and building merchants. Local theatrical group Junction 4 Productions has its home here and Penny Farm run by World Horse Welfare is also nearby. Further afield, there are several caravan parks (Pipers Height and Clifton Fields Caravan Park) situated on Peel Road.

Ballam 
Ballam is a small hamlet in between Moss Side, Peel and Lytham, consisting of a small number of dwellings, a few farms and a small church which was previously the village school.

Westby 
Westby is another small hamlet, towards the north of the parish, located in between Wrea Green and Ballam, just south of Preston New Road.

St. Anne's Church

Westby is notable for the fine Catholic church of St. Anne's, designed by E. W. Pugin and built in 1860.

The conventional church exterior does not prepare the visitor for the striking interior with its elaborate timber roof. Above the altar the timbers follow the apse and form a frame or focal point. At the west end is a gallery.

Despite the unusual shape of the nave windows, the stained glass is largely unspectacular. But two of the windows are noteworthy - the Pre-Raphaelite styled "St Cecilia" in a  green gown, with roses in the cusps, and the "Millennium" window with its inscription.

Fracking at Little Plumpton

Cuadrilla Resources' first and only high-volume hydraulic fracturing job was performed in March 2011, near Blackpool. Cuadrilla halted operations in May 2011 at the site due to seismic activity damaging the casing in the production zone.

In June 2015, Lancashire County Council voted to reject an application by Cuadrilla to extract shale gas by means of  fracking at a site at Little Plumpton. This decision was appealed by the company, however, and the government accepted their appeal in 2016. An appeal against this reversed decision was lost in the Court of Appeal in January 2018.

In November 2017 Cuadrilla, in agreement with the government, financially compensated the local community for the disruption. A community fund of £100,000 was created, and additionally households within 1 km will receive about £2,070 and others within 1.5 kilometres will receive about £150. The cost of Lancashire Constabulary policing the site, since January 2017, was estimated to have been between £6m and £8m.

See also
Listed buildings in Westby-with-Plumptons

References

Civil parishes in Lancashire
Geography of the Borough of Fylde